Nikola Ferić (10 May 1736 – 30 May 1819) was a Croatian prelate of the Catholic Church who served as the bishop of Trebinje-Mrkan from 1792 to 1819. Ferić was the last residential bishop of Trebinje-Mrkan, which was, ever since his death, administered by the bishops of Dubrovnik and the bishops of Mostar-Duvno.

Ferić, born in Dubrovnik in the Republic of Ragusa, received his education in Dubrovnik and Italy, where he became a doctor of theology. After being ordained a priest in 1759, he held various duties, including being a parish priest, papal missionary, synodal examiner, and a confessor of the Poor Clares. In 1792 he was nominated by the Ragusan Senate to become the bishop of Trebinje-Mrkan and was his appointment was confirmed by the Pope that same year. After his consecration, the Ragusan diplomacy tried to obtain a firman from the Ottoman Sultan, that Ferić might freely exercise his duties on the Ottoman part of the Diocese of Trebinje-Mrkan. After a lengthy effort, Ferić received the firman possibly only in 1798.

Biography 

Ferić was born in Dubrovnik in the Republic of Ragusa, to a family of Ivan and Jelena née Ljunić, that originated from  near Slano, and were originally surnamed Gvozdenica, Ferić being the Italianised version of their family name. His father was a shopkeeper. He also had a three-year younger brother Đuro, who also became a priest, and sister Klara.

Ferić received his education from the Jesuits in Dubrovnik and Italy and earned a doctorate in canon law. He was ordained a priest of the Archdiocese of Dubrovnik by the archbishop Arkanđeo Lunić on 14 April 1759 in his chapel of the Virgin of Rosary. As a priest, Ferić served as a parish priest, papal missionary, synodal examiner, and a confessor of the Poor Clares.

The bishop of Trebinje-Mrkan Anzelmo Katić died on 14 January 1792. The Ragusan Senate chose Ferić as his successor only four days later, on 28 January 1792. However, Ferić wasn't their first choice. That same day, they chose the general vicar of the Archdiocese of Dubrovnik Bernard Zamagna as Katić's successor, but he refused the nomination. Ferić's other remaining rival for the post was Petar Ignacije Sorga, who wasn't a priest. Immediately after electing Ferić, the Senate wrote to Benedikt Stojković in Rome to propose Pope Pius VI Ferić's appointment. The Pope accepted the nomination and appointed Ferić as the new bishop of Trebinje-Mrkan on 26 March 1792. His consecration took place in the St. Peter's Basilica in Rome on 9 April 1792. Ferić's consecrator was Cardinal Francesco Saverio de Zelada, with archbishops Antonio Felice Zondadari and Nicola Buschi serving as co-consecrators.

Ferić returned to Dubrovnik in early June 1792. The Senate wrote to Ragusan diplomats at the Ottoman Sublime Porte to try to get a firman for Ferić's free activity on the Ottoman territory. However, for obtaining such a firman, they needed to find the judicial practice (ilam) that confirmed similar practice existed before, and to get a positive opinion (arz) for such a practice from the Bosnian administrator, the same procedure Ferić's predecessor had to take. The new administrator of Bosnia, Husamuddin Pasha, who was appointed on 25 July 1792, arrived in Bosnia only in December 1792. For that reason, Ferić couldn't visit the parishes on the Ottoman side of the border.

As accustomed, the Ragusan diplomats paid homage to every newly-appointed Bosnian administrator. The same was the case with Husamuddin Pasha, to whom the Ragusan diplomat Frano Zamagna paid homage in March 1873. At the same time, he was ordered to get the administrator'sarz for the little money as possible. Husamuddin Pasha requested ilam to be obtained from the capital of Sarajevo, which the Ragusan diplomat managed to obtain, however, he requested a higher price for his arz which Ragusans refused to pay. The Ragusan efforts ultimately failed.

Even though the firman wasn't issued, Ferić visited the parishes on the Ottoman territory at the end of 1793 and the beginning of 1794. The Ragusans hoped that Husamuddin Pasha would soon be dismissed from his post and delayed the efforts to get the Sultan's firman. However, as his dismissal didn't occur, the Ragusans tried again to get the firman directly from Istanbul in April 1795, and again failed, as their condition was the administrator's arz. Husamuddin Pasha was dismissed on 21 June 1797. The Ragusan diplomats asked for the Sultan's firman while they paid the annual tribute to the Ottomans in August 1798. They were successful, however, it is not known when the firman was issued. The diocesan archive has the copy of the firman incorrectly dated to 18 December 1792. Milenko Krešić is of the opinion that the year might be 1798, while the first time the firman was mention was on 6 June 1803. Ferić visited the whole diocese between that time in 1801, while the Propaganda's report on the visitation from 13 March 1801 never once mentioned the firman.

Ferić died in Dubrovnik and is buried at the Franciscan church there. Though the clergy of Trebinje-Mrkan named one of their own Grgo Matuško as the diocesan administrator, the administrator of the Archdiocese of Dubrovnik, Ferić's brother Đuro, appointed his secretary Dominik Sokolović as the Trebinje-Mrkan's diocesan administrator. The Dalmatian government confirmed this appointment, and Sokolović served as the diocesan administrator for the next eighteen years. Finally, through the efforts of the Austrian diplomacy, the Diocese of Trebinje-Mrkan was put under the administration of the bishops of Dubrovnik for an indefinite time by Pope Gregory XVI on 12 September 1839. Again, thanks to the efforts of the Austrian-Hungarian diplomacy, the Diocese of Trebinje-Mrkan is administered by the bishops of Mostar-Duvno ever since 16 June 1890.

Footnotes

References

Books

Journals

Websites 

 

1736 births
1819 deaths
People from Dubrovnik
Ragusan clergy
Bishops of Trebinje-Mrkan
Bishops appointed by Pope Pius VI
Bosnia and Herzegovina Roman Catholic bishops
19th-century Roman Catholic bishops in the Ottoman Empire
18th-century Bosnia and Herzegovina Roman Catholic bishops
19th-century Roman Catholic bishops in Bosnia and Herzegovina